Hays Reef is a small, rocky islet in south-eastern Australia.  It is part of the Hibbs Pyramid Group, lying close to the central western coast of Tasmania.

Fauna
Recorded breeding seabird and wader species are the Pacific gull and sooty oystercatcher.

References

Islands of Tasmania